The Roman Catholic Diocese of Novo Hamburgo is a diocese located in the city of Novo Hamburgo in the Ecclesiastical province of Porto Alegre in Brazil.

History
 2 February 1980: Established as Diocese of Novo Hamburgo from the Metropolitan Archdiocese of Porto Alegre

Bishops
 Bishops of Novo Hamburgo (Roman rite), in reverse chronological order
 Bishop João Francisco Salm (2022.01.19 – ...)
 Bishop Zeno Hastenteufel (2007.03.28 – 2022.01.19)
 Bishop Osvino José Both (1995.11.22 – 2006.06.07), appointed Archbishop of Brazil, Military
 Bishop Carlos José Boaventura Kloppenburg, O.F.M. (1986.08.08 – 1995.11.22)
 Bishop Aloísio Sinésio Bohn (1980.02.13 – 1986.06.27), appointed Bishop of Santa Cruz do Sul, Rio Grande do Sul

Other priest of this diocese who became bishop
Edson Batista de Mello, appointed Bishop of Cachoeira do Sul, Rio Grande do Sul

References
 GCatholic.org
 Catholic Hierarchy
 Diocese website (Portuguese) 

Roman Catholic dioceses in Brazil
Christian organizations established in 1980
Novo Hamburgo, Roman Catholic Diocese of
Roman Catholic dioceses and prelatures established in the 20th century
Novo Hamburgo
1980 establishments in Brazil